Thomas Jefferson Bouldin (1878-1939) was an American politician from Arizona. He served a single term in the Arizona State Senate during the 10th Arizona State Legislature, holding the seat from Apache County.

Biography

Bouldin was born in 1878 in Paint Rock Valley, Alabama.  He graduated from Alabama Medical College and opened a medical practice in Alabama, before moving to St. Johns, Arizona in September 1909.  During World War I he served as a doctor in the U. S. Army.  In 1930 he ran for and was elected to the Arizona State Senate, from Apache County.  He did not seek re-election in 1932.  Bouldin died in St. Johns on September 16, 1939, from a heart attack.

References

Democratic Party Arizona state senators
20th-century American politicians
1878 births
1939 deaths